Gonçalo Manuel Tavares, a Portuguese writer born in August, 1970 in Luanda, Angola. He published his first work in 2001 and since then has been awarded several important prizes. His books have been published in more than 30 countries and the book Jerusalem has been included in the European edition of 1001 Books to Read Before You Die - a guide of the most important novels of all time.

Books 

The Neighborhood (2002–05)

Kingdom Cycle 

 A Man: Klaus Klump (2003)
 Joseph Walser's Machine (2004) 
 Jerusalem (2005)
 Learning to Pray In the Age of Technique (2007)

External links
 
 Translated Interview with Gonçalo Manuel Tavares from BOMB Magazine
 Review of A Man: Klaus Klump from The Millions
 Review of A Man: Klaus Klump from Words Without Borders
 Gonçalo M. Tavares by Pedro Sena Nunes Bomb

References

1970 births
Living people
Portuguese male novelists
Writers from Luanda
21st-century Portuguese novelists